Cthulhu is a fictional cosmic entity created by horror author H. P. Lovecraft.

Cthulhu may also refer to:

Arts and entertainment
 H. P. Lovecraft's Cthulhu: The Whisperer in Darkness, a 1991-92 comics mini-series
 "Cthulhu", a song by Therion of the 1992 album Beyond Sanctorum
 Cthulhu (2000 film), an Australian horror film by Damian Heffernan
 Cthulhu (2007 film), an American horror film
 "Cthulhu", a song by The Acacia Strain from the 2008 album Continent

Other uses
 Cthulhu (Pluto), the largest dark region on Pluto
 Cthulhu (genus), a symbiotic microorganism that lives in the guts of termites
 C'thulhu (assassination), an assassination dark web site
 "Cuttlefish of Cthulhu", the codpiece worn by Dave Brockie, lead vocalist for the heavy metal band GWAR
 Cthulhu (developer)

See also
Call of Cthulhu (disambiguation)
Cthulhu Live, a live-action roleplaying game
Cthulhu 500, a card game designed by Jeff Tidball
Cthulhu Rise, musical band from Kyiv, Ukraine